The Watkinson Dingbat was a 1930s British ultralight monoplane designed by E.T. Watkinson and C.W. Taylor.

Design and development

The Dingbat, otherwise known as the Taylor Watkinson Ding-Bat, was a low-wing monoplane powered by a  Carden-Ford engine. It had a single-seat open cockpit and a fixed conventional landing gear. It was built at Teddington in Middlesex and registered G-AFJA it was first flown at Heston Aerodrome in June 1938.

It was stored during the Second World War, but restored to flying condition in 1959. After a crash in 1975, it was rebuilt, and was still registered in 2010.

Specifications

References

Notes

Bibliography

1930s British civil utility aircraft
Ultralight aircraft
Aircraft first flown in 1938
Low-wing aircraft
Single-engined tractor aircraft